Portknockie railway station was a railway station that served the small fishing village of Portknockie, close to Cullen in Moray. The railway station was opened by the Great North of Scotland Railway (GNoSR) on its Moray Firth coast line in 1886, served by Aberdeen to Elgin trains.

In 1923, the GNoSR became part of the London and North Eastern Railway and at nationalisation in 1948 became part of British Railways. The line was recommended for closure by Dr Beeching's report "The Reshaping of British Railways" and closed on 6 May 1968.

History

Background
In 1881, the Great North of Scotland Railway put a bill to parliament to extend its Portsoy line along the Moray Firth as far as  Buckie. In 1882, the Great North of Scotland applied for permission to build a  line from Portsoy following the coast to Buckie and then running on to Elgin.

Great North of Scotland Railway
The GNoSR station opened as 'Portknockie' on 1 May 1886 with the central section of the coast line, served by through Aberdeen to Elgin trains. In 1923, the Great North of Scotland Railway was absorbed by the  London and North Eastern Railway. This was nationalised in 1948, and services were provided by British Railways. The station and line was recommended for closure by Dr Beeching's in his report "The Reshaping of British Railways" and closed on 6 May 1968.

Services
The GNoSR station was served by through trains running between Aberdeen and Elgin. There were no Sunday services.

The station infrastructure
Portknockie station had a single platform with the typical wooden station building, a passing loop and two platforms that were offset, connected by a pedestrian overbridge. The 1902 OS map shows a signal box on the end of the Findochty platform and another on the Cullen end of the other platform, a weighing machine in the goods yard, a single siding and a loading dock in line with the village side platform and a station agent's or stationmaster's cottage near the entrance to the station. In 1930 one signal box had been removed.

The line was predominantly single track apart from a double track section between Buckie and Portessie. Track lifting took place shortly after closure in 1968.

Station remnants
The station was demolished and houses now occupy the site.

Moray Coast Ride
Much of the trackbed of the old railway now forms the Sustrans Moray Cycle Route.

References

Footnotes

Sources

External links
RAILSCOT on Moray Coast Railway

Former Great North of Scotland Railway stations
Disused railway stations in Moray
Railway stations in Great Britain opened in 1886
Railway stations in Great Britain closed in 1968
Beeching closures in Scotland